Ghayth Armanazi (born 1943) is a Syrian media specialist and former diplomat based in London, England.

Background

He was Head of the London Mission of the Arab League from 1992-2000. He previously worked for the Foreign Ministry of the United Arab Emirates, and also pursued a career in banking.

Born in Damascus, Syria, Armanazi was educated at the Universities of Colorado and London.

Public roles

He currently heads the Syrian Media Centre, London, and is Executive Director of the British-Syrian Society.

Armanazi has long been identified with discernibly Syrian diplomatic viewpoints. Sympathetic observers will credit Syria's long-standing diplomatic positions with great consistency; critics will regard Syria's stance regarding the Palestinians and the Golan Heights as 'hardline': a term which Armanazi himself rejects.

Regarding Syrian communities in other countries, Armanazi has sought to highlight their dynamism and adaptability, pointing out that Syrian expatriates have been able to assimilate well into the various societies which have received them.

See also

 Foreign relations of Syria

External links

(Photo:) * https://web.archive.org/web/20071009040946/http://www.thedohadebates.com/files/images/March05_02.jpg
 https://web.archive.org/web/20070424175901/http://meconsult.clients-lounge.de/join.php/mec/team
 https://web.archive.org/web/20060710200826/http://caabu.org/index.asp?homepage=about&article=ghayth_armanazi
 http://www.britishsyriansociety.org/board.asp#c
 http://www.creativesyria.com/discussion/bio.php?TopicAuthorID=244

1943 births
Living people
Alumni of the University of London
Syrian diplomats
People from Damascus
University of Colorado alumni